Karasevka is a rural locality in Bolsheugonsky Selsoviet Rural Settlement, Lgovsky District, Kursk Oblast, Russia. Population:

Geography 
The village is located on the Byk River (a left tributary of the Seym), 44 km from the Russia–Ukraine border, 65 km south-west of Kursk, 1 km south of the district center – the town Lgov, 10 km from the selsoviet center – Bolshiye Ugony.

 Climate
Karasevka has a warm-summer humid continental climate (Dfb in the Köppen climate classification).

Transport 
Karasevka is located 1 km from the road of regional importance  (Kursk – Lgov – Rylsk – border with Ukraine) as part of the European route E38, 1 km from the road  (Lgov – Sudzha), 2 km from the nearest railway station Lgov I (Lgov-Kiyevsky) (railway lines: Lgov I — Podkosylev, 322 km – Lgov I, Lgov I – Kursk and Navlya – Lgov I).

The rural locality is situated 71.5 km from Kursk Vostochny Airport, 140 km from Belgorod International Airport and 274 km from Voronezh Peter the Great Airport.

References

Notes

Sources

Rural localities in Lgovsky District